Antonio 'Chico' Garcia is a graffiti artist based in the Lower East Side of New York City. He is well known in the neighborhood and has been featured in several periodicals. He contributed artwork to Ray's Candy Store. Some of his art is independent, while other art is commissioned. His work includes paintings, three-dimensional art of various kinds, as well as collaborative canvases with photographer Jonathan White.

References

External links

American graffiti artists
Year of birth missing (living people)
Living people